Raphael is a crater on Mercury. Its name was adopted by the International Astronomical Union (IAU) in 1976, and is named for the Italian painter Raphael (Raffaello Sanzio da Urbino).

Unlike other Mercurian craters of similar size, Raphael is not multi-ringed.

The crater Flaiano lies just south of the center of Raphael.

There is also a high-albedo area east of Flaiano, that is associated with irregular depressions.  The depressions are similar to those within Navoi, Lermontov, Scarlatti, and Praxiteles.  The depressions resemble those associated with volcanic explosions.

References

Impact craters on Mercury
Raphael